Brandon J. Laird (born September 11, 1987), nicknamed "Sushi Boy", is an American of Mexican descent is a professional baseball third baseman who is a free agent. He has played for the New York Yankees and the Houston Astros of Major League Baseball (MLB), and the Hokkaido Nippon-Ham Fighters and Chiba Lotte Marines of Nippon Professional Baseball (NPB). He also played for the Mexico national team at the World Baseball Classic.

High school and college career
Laird attended La Quinta High School in Westminster, California. He was drafted by the Cleveland Indians in the 27th round of the 2005 Major League Baseball draft. He did not sign, opting to attend Cypress College, where he played college baseball for the Cypress Chargers.

Professional career

New York Yankees
The New York Yankees selected Laird in the 27th round of the 2007 Major League Baseball draft. He signed with the Yankees.

On August 2, 2010, Laird was promoted from the Trenton Thunder of the Class AA Eastern League to the Scranton/Wilkes-Barre Yankees of the Class AAA International League. Laird was named both the Most Valuable Player and Rookie of the Year of the Eastern League in 2010, following a breakout season. Following the 2010 season, he was added to the Yankees' 40 man roster in order to protect him from the Rule 5 Draft.

Laird was promoted to the majors for the first time on July 18, 2011, when Ramiro Peña was placed on the disabled list. On July 22, at Yankee Stadium, Laird made his major league debut, and got his first major league hit and RBI against Oakland Athletics pitcher Craig Breslow on a single to center field. He scored his first run earlier in the game, scoring on a single by Nick Swisher after working a walk off of A's pitcher Joey Devine.
The Yankees designated Laird for assignment on August 27, 2012.

Houston Astros
Laird was claimed by the Houston Astros on September 1, 2012. Laird started the 2013 season with the Triple-A Oklahoma City RedHawks. The Astros promoted Laird to the big leagues on April 18, 2013, after Brett Wallace was optioned to Oklahoma City. Laird had been hitting .353 in 12 games to earn his promotion. He was outrighted off the roster on October 2, 2013. Laird ended his 2013 season batting .169.

Washington Nationals
Laird signed a minor league deal with the Kansas City Royals on November 23, 2013. On March 15, 2014, Laird was traded to the Washington Nationals for a player to be named later. He played for the Syracuse Chiefs of the International League, and was named the league's player of the week for the week of June 16‐22.

Hokkaido Nippon Ham Fighters

In November 2014, Laird signed with the Hokkaido Nippon-Ham Fighters of Nippon Professional Baseball (NPB). Laird struggled to start the 2015 season with Hokkaido, batting under .200 into June. On the final day of the All Star break, Fighters third base coach Shirai took Laird out to dinner at a local sushi restaurant to get him to relax. The chef, a big Fighters fan, suggested that Laird should act like he is making sushi when he got into the batter's box to intimidate the pitcher. The next day, he did not do the gesture getting into the batter's box, but after he hit a home run, he acted like he was making sushi and thus the nickname "sushi boy" was born. He started to gain momentum after that performance and had a nice second half, finishing his first season in NPB with 34 home runs and a batting average of .231.

In 2016, Laird led the Pacific League with 39 home runs. He hit the game-winning home run in Game 4 of the 2016 Japan Series, and a grand slam in Game 6. Laird won the Japan Series Most Valuable Player Award.

Laird spent the 2017 and 2018 seasons with the club, but failed to reach an agreement on a contract extension prior to the 2019 season and became a free agent.

Chiba Lotte Marines
On January 15, 2019, Laird signed with the Chiba Lotte Marines of NPB. On July 27, 2022 Chiba Lotte Marines hitter Brandon Laird won the 2022 NPB Home Run Derby

Personal life
Brandon's brother, Gerald, is a catcher who played in the major leagues.

References

External links

Yankees prospect Brandon Laird shows major signs of progress / New Jersey Star Ledger
 

1987 births
Living people
American baseball players of Mexican descent
American expatriate baseball players in Japan
Baseball players from California
Charleston RiverDogs players
Chiba Lotte Marines players
Gulf Coast Yankees players
Hokkaido Nippon-Ham Fighters players
Houston Astros players
Major League Baseball third basemen
New York Yankees players
Nippon Professional Baseball third basemen
Oklahoma City RedHawks players
People from Cypress, California
People from Westminster, California
Phoenix Desert Dogs players
Scranton/Wilkes-Barre Yankees players
Surprise Rafters players
Syracuse Chiefs players
Tampa Yankees players
Trenton Thunder players
2017 World Baseball Classic players